Cain Devore is an American film and television actor. He is known from TV series Dreams, Search for Tomorrow, and TV movie Untamed Love.

Filmography

Films 
 Shrink Rap (2003)
 Interstate 5 (1998)
 Midnight Witness (1993)
 Ramona! (1993)
 Exiled in America (1992)

Television 
 Phantom 2040 (1995)
 Married... with Children (1993)
 As the World Turns (1987)
 One Life to Live (1986–1987)
 Dreams (1984)

References

External links 
 

Living people
1960 births
American male film actors
American male television actors